Dexter Construction Limited is a construction and environmental services company based in Bedford, Nova Scotia, Canada. Its activities include road paving, open-pit mining, equipment rental, soil reclamation, and contracting.

Dexter is part of the group that was involved in cleaning Lake Banook in Dartmouth for the 2009 ICF Canoe Sprint World Championships.

References

Official website

Companies based in Nova Scotia
Construction and civil engineering companies of Canada
Mining engineering companies
Year of establishment missing